Adelaide College of Divinity (ACD) is an accredited higher education provider offering diploma, associate and bachelor's degrees, graduate diplomas, master and doctoral degrees in ministry, it is also a Registered Training Organisation offering certificates and a diploma.

The ACD offers qualifications in its own right in the vocational and higher education sectors and, except for the period 2011–2013, its teaching staff have formed the Department of Theology at Flinders University in the Faculties of Education, Humanities and Law.

The ACD brought together the Adelaide Theological Library, from the collections of the three colleges which had merged for form ACD. The library has grown since the merger and in 2006 held over 60,000 volumes, including many dating back before 1850 and some to the 17th century.

Within the college grounds is a labyrinth designed by Adelaide stained glass artist Cedar Prest to honour the journeys of refugees and migrants. Symbols incorporated in the labyrinth include a large chalice and a central wafer – a reference to Holy Communion. A stylised version of the labyrinth is used as the college logo.

History
The ACD started as an ecumenical consortium of the theological colleges of the Anglican (St Barnabas College), Baptist (Burleigh College), Roman Catholic (the St Francis Xavier Seminary, now the Catholic Theological College) and Uniting (Parkin-Wesley College, from December 2008 known as Uniting College for Leadership and Theology) Churches in 1979, with the Bible College of South Australia in 1980, in Adelaide, South Australia.

In late September 1997, the then three constituent colleges in Adelaide moved to a campus at Brooklyn Park, South Australia which had been vacated by the Salesian College. Teaching began on 7 October and the ACD campus was officially opened on Sunday, 9 November by the Governor of South Australia, Sir Eric Neal.

Nungalinya College was associated with the ACD at one time. Nungalinya College is ecumenical with a focus on theological education and training for ministry for Aboriginal and Torres Strait Islander people. It is located in Darwin, Northern Territory.

In 2003, the Uniting Church moved its distance education focused Coolamon College from Brisbane to Adelaide where it joined the ACD In Brisbane it had been a member of the Brisbane College of Theology and also offered Sydney College of Divinity courses.

In 2009 the Anglican synod voted in favour of withdrawing St Barnabas' College from the ACD and affiliating with the School of Theology of Charles Sturt University. In 2010, the Catholic theological college withdrew from the consortium to become part of the new Adelaide Theological Centre.

Uniting College for Leadership and Theology has been joined by Trinity College Queensland. Trinity was initially a member of the Brisbane College of Theology that was wound up in 2009, and then offered Australian Catholic University qualifications before joining the ACD.

References

External links
Adelaide College of Divinity
Flinders University – School of Theology
The Centre for Theology, Science and Culture at Flinders University
Uniting College for Leadership and Theology
Trinity College, Queensland

Education in Adelaide
Seminaries and theological colleges in Australia
Educational institutions established in 1979
Uniting Church in Australia
1979 establishments in Australia